Haaris Ayaz (born 16 October 1975) is a Pakistani First-class cricketer who plays for the Public Works Department and Karachi. He represented Karachi Zebras team in Faysal Bank T20 Cup 2012-12 season. Against Hyderabad at Karachi in 1998/99 he shared in the world record List A 8th wicket partnership of a 203 run stand, with Shahid Iqbal

References

External links 
 

1975 births
Karachi cricketers
Living people
Pakistani cricketers
Public Works Department cricketers
Cricketers from Karachi
Karachi Zebras cricketers
Karachi Dolphins cricketers
Karachi Whites cricketers
Karachi Blues cricketers
Karachi Port Trust cricketers
Sui Southern Gas Company cricketers